The men's free rifle at 1000 yards was one of 15 events on the Shooting at the 1908 Summer Olympics programme. Each shooter fired 20 shots with a rifle at the target 1,000 yards away (914 m; 0.57 mile). A bulls-eye was worth 5 points, so the maximum possible score was 100. Each nation could enter up to 12 shooters.

Results

References

Sources
 
 

Men's rifle free 1000 yards
Men's 999yd